The Clarksville Community School District, is a public school district in Clarksville, Iowa.  The district serves Clarksville and surrounding areas in northern Butler County.

The school, which serves all grade levels PreK-12 in one building, is located at 318 N. Mather Street in Clarksville.

The school's mascot is the Indians. Their colors are maroon and white.

Schools
Clarksville Elementary School
Clarksville High School

The Indians compete in the Iowa Star Conference.

See also
List of school districts in Iowa

References

External links
 Clarksville Community School District

Education in Butler County, Iowa
School districts in Iowa